This is a list of newspapers in Guam.

List of newspapers
 Pacific Daily News – Hagåtña, Guam.
 Guam Daily Post - Harmon, Guam.

External links
 List of newspapers from Guam from Newspapers Index
 ABYZ News Links: Guam Newspapers and News Media Guide
 Newspapers, Guampedia

Newspapers
Guam
Guam
Guam
Newspapers